Rachel Louise Snyder is an American journalist, writer, and professor. She covers domestic violence and previously worked as a foreign correspondent for the public radio program Marketplace, and also contributed to All Things Considered and This American Life.

A story she reported for This American Life won an Overseas Press Award, along with Ira Glass and Sarah Koenig.

Her work has appeared in The New York Times, The New Yorker, The Washington Post, and Slate. She has lived in London, Cambodia, and Washington, DC and is originally from Chicago.

Works 
 Fugitive denim: a moving story of people and pants in the borderless world of global trade, New York; London: W.W. Norton, 2009. , 
 What We've Lost Is Nothing., New York: Scribner, 2014. , 
 No Visible Bruises: What We Don’t Know About Domestic Violence Can Kill Us, New York : Bloomsbury Publishing Inc., 2019. ,

References

External links

Living people
21st-century American novelists
21st-century American journalists
American women journalists
Year of birth missing (living people)
21st-century American women writers